The Dutch Tweede Divisie in the 1965–66 season was contested by 30 teams, divided in two groups. It would be the last season the Tweede Divisie would be divided in two. From next season onwards, all teams would participate in one league. This also meant that more teams than before were promoted to the Eerste Divisie. No teams had to relegate to amateur football.

New entrants and group changes

Group A
Relegated from the Eerste Divisie:
 Veendam
Entered from the B-group:
 HVC
 SC Gooiland (last season playing as 't Gooi)

Group B
Relegated from the Eerste Divisie:
 Excelsior
Entered from the A-group:
 RCH
 HFC Haarlem
 HFC EDO
FC Den Bosch played as BVV last season

Group A

Group B

See also
 1965–66 Eredivisie
 1965–66 Eerste Divisie

References
Netherlands - List of final tables (RSSSF)

Tweede Divisie seasons
3
Neth